Ammuriya (also spelled Amuria) is a Palestinian village in the Nablus Governorate of the State of Palestine in the northern West Bank, located south of Nablus. According to the Palestinian Central Bureau of Statistics (PCBS) census, Ammuriya had a population of 302 in 2007. There were 48 households and five business establishments in the village.

In 2012, Ammuriya was joined with al-Lubban ash-Sharqiya into a single municipality called after the latter town.

Location
Nearby localities include Iskaka to the north, al-Lubban ash-Sharqiya to the east, Abwein to the south, Arura and Mazari an-Nubani to the southwest and Salfit to the northwest.

History
Pottery sherds from Iron Age II, Hellenistic/Roman, Crusader/Ayyubid and Mamluk eras have been found here.

Ottoman era
In 1596, it appeared in Ottoman tax registers as "ʽAmmuriya", a village in the nahiya of Jabal Qubal in the Nablus Sanjak. It had a population of 7 households and 1 bachelor, all Muslim. The villagers paid taxes on wheat, barley, summer crops, olive trees, goats and beehives, and a press for olive oils or grapes; a total of 2,000 akçe.

In 1838, Edward Robinson noted it as a village in the Jurat Merda district, south of Nablus.

In 1882, the PEF's Survey of Western Palestine (SWP) described it as "A small village on high ground".

British Mandate era
In the 1922 census of Palestine, conducted by the British Mandate authorities, the population was 69, all Muslim, increasing in the 1931 census 85 Muslims in 19 houses. 

In the 1945 statistics the population was 120, all Muslims, with 3,112 dunams of land, according to an official land and population survey. Of this, 1,753 dunams were used for cereals, while 6 dunams were built-up land.

Jordanian era
In the wake of the 1948 Arab–Israeli War, and after the 1949 Armistice Agreements, ʽAmmuriya came under Jordanian rule.

The Jordanian census of 1961 found 157 inhabitants.

1967, and aftermath
In 1967 the village came under Israeli occupation after the Six-Day War, and the same year the population was found to be 130.

In 2012, Ammuriya was joined with al-Lubban ash-Sharqiya in a single municipality called after the latter town.

References

Bibliography

 

  

Perlmann, Joel: The 1967 Census of the West Bank and Gaza Strip: A Digitized Version. Annandale-on-Hudson, N.Y.: Levy Economics Institute of Bard College. November 2011 – February 2012. [Digitized from: Israel Central Bureau of Statistics, Census of Population and Housing, 1967 Conducted in the Areas Administered by the IDF, Vols. 1–5 (1967–70), and Census of Population and Housing: East Jerusalem, Parts 1 and 2 (1968–70).]

External links
 Welcome To 'Ammuriya
 Survey of Western Palestine, Map 14:  IAA, Wikimedia commons 
  Al Lubban ash Sharqiya Village Profile (including ‘Ammuriya Locality), Applied Research Institute–Jerusalem (ARIJ)
  ‘Ammuriya aerial photo, ARIJ

Villages in the West Bank